Teegarden's Star b (also known as Teegarden b) is an exoplanet found orbiting within the habitable zone of Teegarden's Star, an M-type red dwarf around 12 light years away from the Solar System. Together with Teegarden's Star c, GJ 1061 c, d, Luyten b and Tau Ceti e, it is the fourth-closest potentially habitable exoplanet as of April 2020.

Discovery 
In July 2019, a team of more than 150 scientists led by Mathias Zechmeister published a peer-reviewed article in Astronomy & Astrophysics as part of the CARMENES survey supporting the existence of two candidate exoplanets orbiting Teegarden's Star.

Because of the alignment and faintness of Teegarden's Star, Doppler spectroscopy (also known as the radial velocity method) was necessary to detect possible exoplanets. This method detects exoplanets indirectly by observing their effects on a host star's radial velocity, the speed at which it is moving towards or away from the Earth. These radial velocity anomalies in turn produce doppler shifts observable with a spectrograph-equipped telescope of sufficient power.

To accomplish this, the team used the CARMENES instrument on the 3.5-meter telescope of Spain's Calar Alto Observatory. After three years of observation, two periodic radial velocity signals emerged: one at 4.91 days (Teegarden's Star b) and another at 11.41 days (Teegarden's Star c).

Characteristics 

Teegarden's Star b is the innermost known planet orbiting Teegarden's Star, with an orbital period of just 4.91 days. The planet's minimum mass is 1.05 Earth masses; this value would be the true mass if the planet's orbit is not inclined from the Earth's perspective. Because of this, Teegarden's Star b is likely to be rocky. Teegarden's Star b may even have an ocean of water on its surface.

Habitability 

Teegarden's Star b orbits within the habitable zone of its host star, meaning it is possible that its atmospheric composition could allow for stable liquid water on its surface.

Host star 
Teegarden’s Star is a low-mass red dwarf, with a mass of around 9 percent the mass of the Sun's, and with a temperature of around 2,900 Kelvin (2,623 °C or 4,760 F). Due to the very low temperature and luminosity of Teegarden's Star it was only discovered in 2003, since it has an apparent magnitude of only 15.1 (and an absolute magnitude of 17.22). Like most red and brown dwarfs it emits most of its energy in the infrared spectrum. It is also older than the Sun, with an age of 8 billion years.

Astronomers had long thought it was likely that many undiscovered dwarf stars existed within 20 light-years of Earth, because stellar-population surveys show the count of known nearby dwarf stars to be lower than otherwise expected, and these stars are dim and easily overlooked. Teegarden's team thought that these dim stars might be found by data mining some of the huge optical sky survey data sets taken by various programs for other purposes in previous years. So they reexamined the NEAT asteroid tracking data set and found this star. The star was then located on photographic plates from the Palomar Sky Survey taken in 1951. This discovery is significant as the team did not have direct access to any telescopes and did not include professional astronomers at the time of the discovery.

The parallax was initially measured as 0.43 ± 0.13 arcseconds. This would have placed its distance at only 7.50 light-years, making Teegarden's Star only the third star system in order of distance from the Sun, ranking between Barnard's Star and Wolf 359. However, even at that time the anomalously low luminosity (the absolute magnitude would have been 18.5) and high uncertainty in the parallax suggested that it was in fact somewhat farther away, still one of the Sun's nearest neighbors but not nearly as high in the ranking in order of distance. A more accurate parallax measurement of 0.2593 arcseconds was made by George Gatewood in 2009, yielding the now accepted distance of 12.578 light-years.

See also 
 List of largest exoplanets
 List of nearest exoplanets
 List of potentially habitable exoplanets

References 

Exoplanets discovered in 2019
Aries (constellation)
Exoplanets detected by radial velocity
Near-Earth-sized exoplanets in the habitable zone